Witches Woods is a census-designated place (CDP) in the southwest part of the town of Woodstock in Windham County, Connecticut, United States, surrounding Witches Woods Lake. It is bordered to the northeast by the Lake Bungee CDP.

Witches Woods was first listed as a CDP prior to the 2020 census.

References 

Census-designated places in Windham County, Connecticut
Census-designated places in Connecticut